Alexander Lowson "Sandy" Keillor (20 October 1869 – 16 June 1960) was a Scottish footballer, who played for Montrose, Dundee and Scotland, being capped six times between 1891 and 1897.

Born in Dundee, Keillor is one of only two men to be selected for Scotland while playing for Montrose, alongside George Bowman who was a teammate in 1892. Keillor joined Dundee at the club's inception in 1893, and would set a number of firsts for the club during his lengthy stint there. He would play in Dundee's first ever competitive match in a league game against Rangers on 12 August 1893, was among the first Dundee players (alongside fellow Dees Frank Barrett and William Longair) to be capped by Scotland in 1894, and was the first Dundee player to score for Scotland in 1896.

References

Sources

External links
London Hearts profile (Scotland)
London Hearts profile (Scottish League)

1869 births
1960 deaths
Scottish footballers
Scotland international footballers
Montrose F.C. players
Dundee F.C. players
Footballers from Dundee
Scottish Football League players
Scottish Football League representative players
Association football outside forwards
People educated at Montrose Academy